Craig Jones (born February 11, 1972), also known as 133, is an American musician. He is the sampler and keyboardist for the heavy metal band Slipknot, in which he is designated #5. Jones joined the band in early 1996, shortly after the band had finished the recording of its demo album Mate. Feed. Kill. Repeat.. Initially, he was brought in to replace Donnie Steele, one of the two original guitarists, though he quickly moved on to the role of sampling and keyboards. Following the departure of fellow bandmate and drummer Joey Jordison in 2013, Jones is the second-longest-serving member in the band.

Career
Jones joined Slipknot in early 1996, replacing original guitarist Donnie Steele after the recording of the band's debut demo Mate. Feed. Kill. Repeat. He was enlisted to the band by drummer Joey Jordison, with whom Jones had previously worked (alongside guitarist Josh Brainard) in the band Modifidious. However, shortly after joining the band, the "electronics and computer genius" moved over to the role of sampler due to the increase in sound effects, background noises/programmed samples and media samples used in the band's music. Mick Thomson replaced him on guitar. Jordison claimed that Jones was happy with the change, noting that "he liked doing that anyway, coming up with all these noises and sounds". Jones' contribution to the band has been described by BBC Music as "provid[ing] samples, speeches and noises as a kind of audio garnish in the band's dark maelstrom".

Jones was given the nickname "133" as a reference to the processor speed of his computer, 133 MHz, which author Joel McIver claims "was considered the state of the art" at the time.

In September 2004, it was announced that Jones would not be performing with Slipknot for a short period of the band's European tour due to a "medical emergency". A statement on the band's official website explained that "Craig Jones #133 (#5) has been suffering incredible pain during the first week of our European tour and has been unable to eat or sleep properly. Therefore, a decision was made for him to return to the States for emergency dental surgery". Speaking about the situation, guitarist Jim Root explained that "We're filling his spot, we've got a picture of him in the dressing room and we miss him every day, [but] we couldn't cancel the tour".

Mask
Upon joining the band as a guitarist, Jones initially wore women's pantyhose on his head when performing, which was said to give his face a "compressed, robber-like look". This was later changed to an astronaut space helmet with long nails hammered through it. The helmet was later replaced by a bondage mask, and a zipper was also added over the mouth area.

Along with those of Jordison, Root and Thomson, Jones' mask has been acknowledged by fans as having stayed very much consistent over the course of Slipknot's career. For the group's 2019 album We Are Not Your Kind, his mask was slightly modified, with the nails being replaced by screws and being longer at the top of the mask, achieving a mohawk effect.

Personal life
Jones is often identified by the media as the most quiet and private member of Slipknot, earning him the nickname "The Quiet One". Vocalist Corey Taylor has commented on his demeanour by describing him as "the quietly scary type". Slipknot producer Ross Robinson has added that he "would try to get him to talk and he would just sit and stare at [him]". Loudwire's Graham Hartmann noted that he "almost never speaks" and "keeps people at a distance", theorising that these qualities inspired the style of his mask. Ian Gittins of The Guardian described Jones as "patently a strange individual", as well as quoting the band's manager's dubbing of the sampler as "the Unabomber", a reference to terrorist Ted Kaczynski.

When asked early in his career about what job he might be working at if not in Slipknot, Jones responded that he'd likely be "driving forklifts in a warehouse all day long", although he has also joked that he would "probably be out killing people", which has earned him the nickname "The Killer". According to Robinson, the latter comment was the first the sampler made in an interview, and it inspired a number of complaints from readers of the publication to which it was made.

Discography

with Slipknot 
Slipknot (1999)
Iowa (2001)
Vol. 3: (The Subliminal Verses) (2004)
All Hope Is Gone (2008)
.5: The Gray Chapter (2014)
We Are Not Your Kind (2019)
 The End, So Far (2022)

Compilation albums 

 Antennas to Hell (2012)

Video albums 

 Welcome to Our Neighborhood (1999)
 Disasterpieces (2002)
 Voliminal: Inside the Nine (2006)
 Nine: The Making of "All Hope Is Gone" (2008)
 Of the (sic): Your Nightmares, Our Dreams (2009)
 (sic)nesses (2010)
 Goat (2011)
 Day of the Gusano: Live in Mexico (2017)

Filmography
 Rollerball (2002)

Equipment

M.F.K.R. era 1996
White Gibson Explorer Guitar

Slipknot era 1999–2001

AKAI MPC2000XL sampler
Clavia Nord Lead Synth or a Yamaha Cs6x for 741267000027
Roland JP-8000
Yamaha controller
Yamaha PSR 720

Iowa era 2001–2004
Roland SP-808 GrooveSampler
Roland SP-808EX/E-mix station

Vol. 3: (The Subliminal Verses) era 2004–2008
Hardware and software samplers
Korg MicroKontrol Midi keyboard/pad controller

All Hope Is Gone era 2008–2014
Korg Kontrol 49 Midi keyboard/pad controller
Cakewalk Sonar

References

Other sources

External links

Slipknot official website

1972 births
American heavy metal keyboardists
American heavy metal musicians
Grammy Award winners
Living people
Musicians from Des Moines, Iowa
Roadrunner Records artists
Slipknot (band) members